The Arctic Archipelago, also known as the Canadian Arctic Archipelago, is an archipelago lying to the north of the Canadian continental mainland, excluding Greenland (an autonomous territory of Denmark) and Iceland.

The archipelago is showing some effects of climate change, with some computer estimates determining that melting there will contribute  to the rise in sea levels by 2100.

History
Around 2500 BCE, the first humans, the Paleo-Eskimos, arrived in the archipelago from the Canadian mainland. Between 1000–1500 CE, they were replaced by the Thule people, who are the ancestors of today's Inuit.

British claims on the islands, the British Arctic Territories, were based on the explorations in the 1570s by Martin Frobisher. Canadian sovereignty was originally (1870–80) only over island portions that drained into Foxe Basin, Hudson Bay and Hudson Strait. Canadian sovereignty over the islands was established by 1880 when Britain transferred them to Canada. The District of Franklin – established in 1895 – comprised almost all of the archipelago. The district was dissolved upon the creation of Nunavut in 1999. Canada claims all the waterways of the Northwest Passage as Canadian Internal Waters; however, the United States and most other maritime countries view these as international waters. Disagreement over the passages' status has raised Canadian concerns about environmental enforcement, national security, and general sovereignty. East of Ellesmere Island, in the Nares Strait, lies Hans Island, ownership of which is now shared between Canada and Denmark, after a decades-long dispute.

Geography

It is bounded on the west by the Beaufort Sea; on the northwest by the Arctic Ocean; on the east by Greenland, Baffin Bay and Davis Strait; and on the south by Hudson Bay and the Canadian mainland. The various islands are separated from each other and the continental mainland by a series of waterways collectively known as the Northwest Passage. Two large peninsulas, Boothia and Melville, extend northward from the mainland. The northernmost cluster of islands, including Ellesmere Island, is known as the Queen Elizabeth Islands and was formerly the Parry Islands.

* NT = Northwest Territories, NU = Nunavut

After Greenland, the archipelago is the world's largest high-Arctic land area. The climate of the islands is Arctic, and the terrain consists of tundra except in mountainous regions. Most of the islands are uninhabited; human settlement is extremely thin and scattered, being mainly coastal Inuit settlements on the southern islands.

Map with links to islands

Islands not on map

 Beechey
 Broughton (population: 593)
 Dorset (population: 1,396)
 Duke of York
 East Pen
 Flaherty (population: 1,010)
 Haig-Thomas
 Hans
 Herschel
 Igloolik (population: 2,049)
 Killiniq
 Ottawa
 Prince Leopold
 Qikiqtaryuaq (formerly Jenny Lind Island)
 Skraeling
 Trodeley
 Umingmalik (formerly Gateshead Island)
 Weston

Communities

Populated islands
Of the more than 36,000 islands, only 11 are populated. Baffin Island, the largest, also has the largest population of 13,309. The population accounts for 67.37 per cent of the 19,355 people in the Qikiqtaaluk Region, 56.51 per cent of the population of the Arctic Archipelago, and 35.38 per cent of the population of Nunavut.

Mapping

 King Christian Island, 
 Borden Island, 
 Lougheed Island, 
 Brock Island, 
 Mackenzie King Island, 
 Helena Island, 
 Cameron Island, 
 Emerald Isle, 
 Prince Patrick Island, 
 Île Vanier, 
 Eglinton Island, 
 Alexander Island, 
 Bathurst Island, 
 Melville Island, 
 Byam Martin Island, 
 Banks Island, 
 Stefansson Island, 
 Russell Island, 
 Prince of Wales Island, 
 Prescott Island, 
 Somerset Island, 
 Victoria Island, 
 King William Island, 
 Matty Island, 
 Wales Island, 
 Belcher Islands, 
 Long Island, 
 Akimiski Island, 
 Charlton Island, 
 Ellesmere Island, 
 Meighen Island, 
 Axel Heiberg Island, 
 Ellef Ringnes Island, 
 Amund Ringnes Island, 
 Cornwall Island, 
 Graham Island, 
 North Kent Island, 
 Baillie-Hamilton Island, 
 Little Cornwallis Island, 
 Cornwallis Island, 
 Devon Island, 
 Bylot Island, 
 Baffin Island, 
 Jens Munk Island, 
 Koch Island, 
 Bray Island, 
 Rowley Island, 
 Foley Island, 
 Air Force Island, 
 Prince Charles Island, 
 Vansittart Island, 
 White Island, 
 Southampton Island, 
 Resolution Island, 
 Loks Land Island, 
 Akpatok Island, 
 Big Island, 
 Salisbury Island, 
 Nottingham Island, 
 Mansel Island, 
 Coats Island, 
 Beechey Island, 
 Broughton Island, 
 Dorset Island, 
 Duke of York Archipelago, 
 East Pen Island, 
 Flaherty Island, 
 Haig-Thomas Island, 
 Hans Island, 
 Herschel Island, 
 Igloolik Island, 
 Killiniq Island, 
 Ottawa Islands, 
 Prince Leopold Island, 
 Jenny Lind Island, 
 Skraeling Island, 
 Trodely Island, 
 Gateshead Island, 
 Weston Island,

See also

 Last Ice Area
List of Canadian islands by area
 List of islands of Canada

References

Further reading

 Aiken, S.G., M.J. Dallwitz, L.L. Consaul, et al. Flora of the Canadian Arctic Archipelago: Descriptions, Illustrations, Identification, and Information Retrieval[CD]. Ottawa: NRC Research Press; Ottawa: Canadian Museum of Nature, 2007. .
 Aiken, S. G., Laurie Lynn Consaul, and M. J. Dallwitz. Grasses of the Canadian Arctic Archipelago. Ottawa: Research Division, Canadian Museum of Nature, 1995.

 Bouchard, Giselle. Freshwater Diatom Biogeography of the Canadian Arctic Archipelago. Ottawa: Library and Archives Canada, 2005. 
 Brown, Roger James Evan. Permafrost in the Canadian Arctic Archipelago. National Research Council of Canada, Division of Building Research, 1972.
 Cota GF, LW Cooper, DA Darby, and IL Larsen. 2006. "Unexpectedly High Radioactivity Burdens in Ice-Rafted Sediments from the Canadian Arctic Archipelago". The Science of the Total Environment. 366, no. 1: 253–61.
 Dunphy, Michael. Validation of a modelling system for tides in the Canadian Arctic Archipelago. Canadian technical report of hydrography and ocean sciences, 243. Dartmouth, N.S.: Fisheries and Oceans Canada, 2005.

 Hamilton, Paul B., Konrad Gajewski, David E. Atkinson, and David R.S. Lean. 2001. "Physical and Chemical Limnology of 204 Lakes from the Canadian Arctic Archipelago". Hydrobiologia. 457, no. 1/3: 133–148.
 Mi︠a︡rss, Tiĭu, Mark V. H. Wilson, and R. Thorsteinsson. Silurian and Lower Devonian Thelodonts and Putative Chondrichthyans from the Canadian Arctic Archipelago. Special papers in palaeontology, no. 75. London: Palaeontological Association, 2006. 
 Michel, C Ingram, R G, and L R Harris. 2006. "Variability in Oceanographic and Ecological Processes in the Canadian Arctic Archipelago". Progress in Oceanography. 71, no. 2: 379.
 Porsild, A.E. The Vascular Plants of the Western Canadian Arctic Archipelago. Ottawa: E. Cloutier, Queen's printer, 1955.
 Rae, R. W. Climate of the Canadian Arctic Archipelago. Toronto: Canada Dept. of Transport, 1951.
 Thorsteinsson, R., and Ulrich Mayr. The Sedimentary Rocks of Devon Island, Canadian Arctic Archipelago. Ottawa, Canada: Geological Survey of Canada, 1987. 
 Van der Baaren, Augustine, and S. J. Prinsenberg. Geostrophic transport estimates from the Canadian Arctic Archipelago. Dartmouth, N.S.: Ocean Sciences Division, Maritimes Region, Fisheries and Oceans Canada, Bedford Institute of Oceanography, 2002.

 
Archipelagoes of Canada
Archipelagoes of the Arctic Ocean
Northern Canada
Regions of the Arctic